Algés is a former civil parish in the municipality of Oeiras, in Lisbon metropolitan area, Portugal. In 2013, the parish merged into the new parish Algés, Linda-a-Velha e Cruz Quebrada-Dafundo. The population in 2011 was 22,273, in an area of 1.98 km². The parish is located near the Tagus river, between the town of Oeiras and the capital city of Lisbon. It is also a part of the Greater Lisbon Area. It is mostly a residential suburb.

Algés was elevated to a town on August 16, 1991, and the parish was officially created on June 11, 1993, after separating from the parish of Carnaxide.

Sport
 União Desportiva e Recreativa de Algés (UDRA)
 Sport Algés e Dafundo

References